Fabio de Souza may refer to:

Fábio de Souza (footballer born 1975), Brazilian footballer for FC Herisau
Fábio Souza de Oliveira (born 1984), Brazilian footballer for Goiás
Fábio de Souza Loureiro (born 1980), Brazilian footballer in Honduras
Fábio Fernandes de Sousa (born 1982), Brazilian politician from Goiás

See also
 Fabio De Sousa (born 1997), American soccer player